The season started with 2 new teams Burgan SC and Al-Tadhamon SC.

Kuwait SC narrowly won the title by edging out rivals Al Qadsia with a 2-1 win over Al Salmiya clinched in injury time, just moments after Al Qadsia's final league match.

Teams

Lists of teams and locations

Personnel and sponsorship

Foreign players

League table

References

External links
Kuwait League Fixtures and Results at FIFA
Kuwaiti Premier League (Arabic)
xscores.com Kuwait Premier League
goalzz.com - Kuwaiti League
RSSSF.com - Kuwait - List of Champions

Kuwait Premier League seasons
Premier League
Kuwaiti Premier League